George Dehaney (17 October 1760 – 1807) was a noted amateur cricketer in the late 18th century.  His career spanned the 1789 to 1793 seasons and he played mainly for Marylebone Cricket Club (MCC), of which he was an early member.  Dehaney was a prolific player in the 1793 season and appeared in ten of the 17 first-class matches recorded but, curiously, that was his last season.

Dehaney was primarily a batsman who made 16 known appearances in first-class cricket matches and scored a total of 173 runs in 28 innings with a highest score of 39.  He rarely bowled and is credited with just one wicket.  He made only 5 catches, which suggests he was an outfielder.

English cricketers
English cricketers of 1787 to 1825
Marylebone Cricket Club cricketers
1807 deaths
1760 births
Gentlemen of England cricketers
R. Leigh's XI cricketers
Old Westminsters cricketers
Hampshire and Marylebone Cricket Club cricketers